Abergynolwyn railway station  is a station on the Talyllyn Railway near Abergynolwyn, Gwynedd, in Mid-Wales. The name 'Abergynolwyn' means 'Mouth-of-the-River-with-a-Whirlpool'.

History

Pre-preservation

Operation 
Abergynolwyn was the original passenger terminus. A mineral line extended south-west to the incline up to the slate quarry at Bryn Eglwys. This location was chosen as it had a plentiful water supply from the local stream, and was close to the quarry, which supplied some of the building materials.

From February 1867, passenger trains started from  instead, where the railway's permanent locomotive shed had been built. The siding leading to the locomotive shed at Ty Dwr was removed, but the water column was retained, and was still used until the early 1950s.

Buildings and Station layout
The original station building was built for the opening of the railway to passenger services in 1867. The station was not built out of slate, like all the other stations on the railway, because it was built before the railway's construction finished, when there was no slate from the Bryn Eglwys quarry to build it out of. A platform was provided for passengers, on the north side of the line.

A siding was provided at the west end of the station, just before the start of the run-round loop. The date at which this was first laid is unknown, but it was between 1889 and 1901; it was taken out of use shortly before the First World War. The siding was reinstated during the Second World War to load pit props from nearby forests to be taken down to Tywyn. The siding was removed again in the early 1950s.

In the 1930s, the station building was replaced, because the original building was in need of extensive repairs which would have been uneconomical to do. The new building was built out of slate blocks, like most of the other buildings on the railway. The west end of the building was used as a lookout post for the Home Guard during the Second World War, and gunports were cut in the west wall of the station.

Post-preservation

Operation
The watering point at Ty Dwr fell out of use in the early 1950s, shortly after preservation. In December 2018, a project was launched to re-build the water tower.

In 1976, the -long mineral extension to the foot of the Alltwyllt incline was re-opened for passenger services.  was built at the new terminus. Abergynolwyn remains the principal station at the eastern end of the line as it has better passenger facilities than Nant Gwernol.

Buildings
The station building was replaced again in 1969, with a larger building, also constructed out of slate, as the 1930s structure was both in need of much repair and too small to serve the increasing tourist traffic being carried. This newest building has since been extended to the west, the extension looking externally similar to the original wooden station building.

A signal box with a 14-lever lever frame was also constructed at the same time. The base of the signal box was constructed out of slate blocks salvaged from derelict buildings in the Bryn Eglwys quarry.

On 6 May 1991, a toilet block was opened just to the north-east of the station building.

In fiction 
In The Railway Series by Rev. Wilbert Awdry, Skarloey station on the Skarloey Railway was based on this station.

Gallery

References

Talyllyn Railway Guide Book

External links 
 Station on navigable O.S. map

Heritage railway stations in Gwynedd
Talyllyn Railway stations
1866 establishments in Wales
Railway stations in Great Britain opened in 1866
Abergynolwyn